The Human Element is the debut full-length album released on January 21, 2011 by Oshawa, Ontario rock duo The Standstills. The album was recorded off the floor at a cottage studio in Fenelon Falls, Ontario with engineer Damien Jacobs. The album was self-produced with JUNO Awards winner Dan Brodbeck handling mixing duties. All songs were written by The Standstills except for Black Betty, originally by Ledbelly. A music video was released for Black Betty on June 21, 2011 filmed by Joe Andrus.

Track listing

The Standstills albums
2011 debut albums
Self-released albums